The Montagne d'Argent or Monte Prata (meaning silver mountain) is a hill in northeast French Guiana, next to Pointe Béhague, on the estuary of the Oyapock River. In 1998, the mountain is protected by Conservatoire du littoral, because 22 petroglyphs had been discovered in the mountain.

In 1852, a penal colony was established on a former coffee plantation, and was the first agricultural penal colony. The colony was finally closed in 1910, and was an economic failure with many prisoners dying or becoming ill.

References

Defunct prisons in French Guiana
Mountains of French Guiana
Petroglyphs in South America
Protected areas of French Guiana